The Santa Fe College Teaching Zoo is a  zoo in Gainesville, Florida. As part of Santa Fe College, It is the only college zookeeper training facility in the United States with its own AZA-accredited zoo on grounds, and has been accredited since 2000.

Guided tours led by students in the program are available at the teaching zoo if scheduled ahead of time; visitors may also take a self-guided tours.

History

The Santa Fe College Teaching Zoo was established in 1970. It comprises  of forested land on the west side of the Santa Fe College main campus.

Animals

The zoo is home to over 200 individual animals representing more than 75 species, including mammals, reptiles, amphibians, insects, and birds.

Mammals
Asian small-clawed otter
Caracal
Common squirrel monkey
Key deer
Lar gibbon
Matschie's tree-kangaroo
Nyala
Ocelot
Perdido Key beach mouse
Red ruffed lemur
Southern three-banded armadillo
White-throated capuchin

Herptiles

Alligator snapping turtle
American alligator
Asian forest tortoise
Ball python
Common kingsnake
Common musk turtle
Corn snake
Diamondback terrapin
Dusky pygmy rattlesnake
Eastern copperhead
Eastern diamondback rattlesnake
Eastern indigo snake
European glass lizard
False water cobra
Florida box turtle
Florida pine snake
Florida red-bellied cooter
Florida softshell turtle
Galápagos tortoise
Gila monster
Gopher tortoise
Green and black poison dart frog
Leopard gecko
Leopard tortoise
Peninsula cooter
Prehensile-tailed skink
Red-footed tortoise
Sinaloan milk snake
Tokay gecko
Yellow-bellied slider

Birds
American white ibis
Bald eagle
Barred owl
Black-crowned night heron
Blue-winged teal
Cattle egret
Cuban amazon
Emu
Fulvous whistling duck
Golden parakeet
Guam rail
Guinea turaco
Grey crowned crane
Grey parrot
Hawk-headed parrot
Indian peafowl
Laughing kookaburra
Northern red-billed hornbill
Redhead
Roseate spoonbill
Turkey vulture
Wood duck
Yellow-crowned amazon

The zoo also participates in several AZA Species Survival Plan (SSP) programs, for white-handed gibbons and Matschie's tree-kangaroo as well as for the Asian small-clawed otter, red ruffed lemur, Guam rail, Perdido Key beach mouse and ocelot.

The SF Zoo Animal Technology Program

Students spend 5 semesters learning about animal husbandry, breeding, nutrition, medical care, physiology, taxonomic relationships, conservation, enclosure construction, proper zoo sanitation, and other topics through classwork and actual work as keepers in the zoo.

Students of the SF Zoo Animal Technology Program are known as Zooies.

Events

The zoo is a popular destination for both local residents and tourists. The zoo hosts several events open to the public throughout the year, including Party for the Planet (celebrating Earth Day) and "Boo at the Zoo" (BATZ) Halloween festival.

Notes

External links

Buildings and structures in Gainesville, Florida
Education in Gainesville, Florida
Tourist attractions in Gainesville, Florida
Zoos in Florida